The Chuck Bednarik Award is presented annually to the defensive player in college football as judged by the Maxwell Football Club to be the best in the United States. The award is named for Chuck Bednarik, a former college and professional American football player. Voters for the Maxwell College Awards are NCAA head college football coaches, members of the Maxwell Football Club, and sportswriters and sportscasters from across the country. The Maxwell Club is located in Philadelphia, Pennsylvania and the presentations are held in Atlantic City, New Jersey. Club members are given voting privileges for the award.

Winners

See also
 Bronko Nagurski Trophy, a similar award given by the Football Writers Association of America

References
General
 

Footnotes

External links
Official website

College football national player awards
Awards established in 1995